Vijaydan Detha (1 September 1926 – 10 November 2013), also known as Bijji, was a noted Indian writer of Rajasthani literature. He was a recipient of several awards including the Padma Shri and the Sahitya Akademi Award.

Detha has more than 800 short stories to his credit, which have been translated into English and other languages. With Komal Kothari, he founded Rupayan Sansthan, an institute that documents Rajasthani folklore, art, and music. His literary works include Bataan ri Phulwari (Garden of Tales), a 14-volume collection of stories that draws on folklore in the spoken dialects of Rajasthan. Many of his stories and novels have been adapted for the stage and the screen: adaptations include Mani Kaul's Duvidha (1973), Habib Tanvir and Shyam Benegal's Charandas Chor (1975), Prakash Jha's Parinati (1986), Amol Palekar's Paheli (2005), Pushpendra Singh's The Honour Keeper (2014), Dedipya Joshii's Kaanchli Life in a Slough (2020), Pushpendra Singh's Laila aur Satt Geet (2020)

Biography
Vijaydan Detha hailed from the Detha clan of the Charan community. His father Sabaldan Detha and grandfather Jugtidan Detha were also well-known poets of Rajasthan. Detha lost his father and two of his brothers in a feud when he was four years old. At the age of six he moved to Jaitaran (25 km from Borunda), where his brother Sumerdan worked in a civil court and where Detha studied until Class IV. Sumerdan had a transferable job, so Detha moved with him, studying in Bihar and Barmer. It was in Barmer, while competing with another student, Narsingh Rajpurohit, that Detha realised that he wanted to be a writer. Sumerdan later transferred to Jodhpur, where Detha studied at Durbar School.

Detha considered Sarat Chandra Chattopadhyay as his first inspiration. He is equally passionate about Anton Chekhov. He was initially critical of Rabindranath Tagore, but he changed his mind after reading Tagore's 'Stri Patra'.

Detha joined college in 1944. By that time, he had already established his name in poetry. However, he credited his success to his cousin brother Kuberdan Detha, who had left school after Class X. Detha used to pass off Kuberdan's poems as his, and the appreciation he received for those poems made him want to establish his own name as a writer.

One of his first controversial works was Bapu Ke Teen Hatyare, a critique of the work of Harivanshrai Bachchan, Sumitranandan Pant and Narendra Sharma. This trio of authors brought out books about Gandhi within two months of Gandhi's death.

In 1950–52, Detha read and was inspired by 19th-century Russian literature. That is when he thought to himself: "If you do not want to be a mediocre writer, you should return to your village and write in Rajasthani." By that time, he had already written 1300 poems and 300 short stories.

Detha's stories have been adapted into various films and dramas. In 1973, renowned filmmaker Mani Kaul directed Duvidha, based on Detha's story of the same name. The film, much of which was shot in Detha's village Borunda, received worldwide acclaim. Later, Amol Palekar directed Paheli based on the same story, starring Shah Rukh Khan. Paheli was also India's official entry to the Academy Awards. Prakah Jha made Parinati, a film based on Detha's story. Habib Tanvir adapted his story into one of his most acclaimed plays Charandas Chor, which was later adapted into a film by Shyam Benegal. Later director Pushpendra Singh made a feature film The Honour Keeper on his short story "Lajwanti" and in the year 2020 Writer-Director Dedipya Joshii has made the Hindi-Rajasthani film Kaanchli Life in a Slough & Director Pushpendra Singh also made the Gojri film Laila aur Satt Geet on his famous story 'Kenchuli'.

Talking to Mahendra Lalas in India Today, he said, "My land [Rajasthan] is full of stories, whatever I've written is just a drop of the ocean". Detha, was inspired by Shah Govradhan Lal Kabra to write in Rajasthani "till date I have not written in any other language", he said regarding his love for the language. He portrayed the sufferings of the poor in his writings and was also tipped for the Nobel Prize for Literature in 2011 which ultimately went to Tomas Tranströmer. Vijay Dan Detha is survived by four sons and a daughter.

Works

Rajasthani
 Batan Ri Phulwari, vol. 1–14, 1960–1975, folklores Published by Rajasthani Granthagar, Jodhpur
 Prerana co-edited with Komal Kothari, 1953
 Soratha, 1956–1958
 Parampara , edited three special issues – Folk songs, Gora Hatja, Jethava Ra 
 Rajasthani Lokgeet, folk songs of Rajasthan, six volumes, 1958
 Tido Rao, first pocket book in Rajasthani, 1965
 Uljhan,1984, novel
 Alekhun Hitler, 1984, short stories
 Roonkh, 1987
 Kaboo Rani, 1989, children's stories

Hindi 
Due to respect for his mother tongue Rajasthani, Bijji has never written in any other language, most of his works are translated into Hindi by one of his sons Kailash Kabeer.

Baton Ki Bagiya vol. 1–14, 2019, (Hindi translation of Batan Ri Phulwari) Published by Rajasthani Granthagar, Jodhpur
Usha, 1946, poetry
Bapu ke teen hatyare, 1948, critics
Column in Jwala Weekly, 1949–1952
Sahitya aur samaj, 1960, essays
Anokha Ped, illustrated children's stories, 1968
Phoolwari, Hindi translation by Kailash Kabir, 1992
Chaudharain Ki Chaturai, short stories, 1996
Antaral, 1997, short stories
Sapan Priya, 1997, short stories
Mero Darad Na Jane Koy, 1997, essays
Atirikta, 1997, critics
Mahamilan, novel, 1998
Priya Mrinal, short stories, 1998

Detha also been credited for editing following works
 Complete work of Ganeshi Lal Vyas for Sahitya Akademi
 Rajasthani-Hindi Kahawat Kosh

Awards and honours
Sahitya Akademi Award for Rajasthani in 1974
Bhartiya Bhasa Parishad Award in 1992
Marudhara Puraskar in 1995
Bihari Puraskar in 2002 
Sahitya Chudamani Award in 2006
Padma Shri in 2007
Rao Siha 2011 by Mehrangarh Museum Trust
Rajasthan Ratna in 2012

References

Bibliography

External links

 Detha's two stories translated in English from World without border
 English translation of The epic of straw
 Detha's interview on Tehelka
 Detha's Authograph and picture
 Vijaydan Detha, BBC Hindi, 10 November 2013

1926 births
2013 deaths
Writers from Rajasthan
Rajasthani people
Recipients of the Padma Shri in literature & education
Rajasthani-language writers
Recipients of the Sahitya Akademi Award in Rajasthani
People from Jodhpur
Indian children's writers
20th-century Indian novelists
20th-century Indian poets
20th-century Indian short story writers
Charan
Indian folklorists